"I Have Two Hands" is an English-language nursery rhyme from the Philippines. The magazine Philippine Public Schools noted in 1929 that the rhyme was widely being taught in elementary schools by then. The song is featured in the 1949 short play Salutation Before the Hour by Reuben Canoy and Francisco Lopez, which related the rhyme's "clean" hands to the importance of voting fairly during elections.

The Hong Kong pop duo Twins covered the rhyme for their 2004 album Singing in the Twins Wonderland (Volume 3).

Lyrics

In popular culture
The 1985 Filipino comedy film I Have Three Hands is titled in reference to the nursery rhyme.

References

Nursery rhymes
Traditional children's songs
English-language Filipino songs